Equisetum pratense, commonly known as meadow horsetail, shade horsetail or shady horsetail, is a widespread horsetail (Equisetophyta) fern. Shade horsetail can be commonly found in forests with tall trees or very thick foliage that can provide shade and tends to grow closer and thicker around streams, ponds and rivers. The specific epithet pratense is Latin, meaning pasture or meadow dwelling.

Description

The centrum is approximately one sixth of the diameter of the stem. The pale sheaths bear slender brown teeth with white margins.

Cones mature in late spring.

Habitat
Equisetum pratense occurs in alluvial woods, thickets, mossy glades, and calcareous meadows. It is a common pioneer species, commonly growing where instability or water erosion leaves an often open ground surface or where sandy alluvium accumulates beside streams. Where vegetation is more abundant, the fern occurs only as sparse and diminutive shoots, as the fern is succumbing to competition in a later seral community.

The plant is widespread, occurring from Iceland and northern Britain and Northern Ireland through northern and central Europe as far south as the Alps. It grows across most of northern Asia to Japan and through northern parts of North America from Alaska to Labrador.

Toxicity
Equisetum pratense contains the enzyme thiaminase which destroys thiamine (vitamin B1). In sufficient quantity it is therefore toxic.

References

pratense
Plants described in 1784
Taxa named by Jakob Friedrich Ehrhart